Pete Jacobs (born 27 October 1981) is an Australian professional triathlete competing primarily in long-distance, non-drafting triathlon events. He is the winner of the 2012 Ironman World Championship.

Athletic career
Jacobs was born to parents Jenny and Geoff in Sydney, Australia and raised in the Northern Beaches area. He grew up following his mother to local triathlon events but took to surf lifesaving as well as cross country running growing up, but states that he never took running seriously at that point. Jacobs started competing in triathlon at the age of 18. During his training at the pool for surf lifesaving he meet other triathletes that helped guide him into the sport. It wasn't until after four years in a landscaping apprenticeship, which he started right out of school, that he decided to turn pro.

Jacobs first Ironman victory came in 2011 at the Ironman Australia event after numerous top 5 placings in Ironman and Challenge Roth triathlon events. He routinely posts the top swim and run times at his racing events, and even posted the third fastest run time on the Ironman World Championship course in 2011. It wasn't until his win at the 2012 Ironman World Championship did the three-time Hawaii Ironman top ten finisher posted his breakthrough performance where he won by five minutes over second-place finisher Andreas Raelert.

In 2014 Jacobs received criticism from Ironman CEO Andrew Messick, who accused him of having a lack of professionalism when he claimed his automatic qualifying spot for the 2014 Ironman World Championship at Ironman Switzerland. In that race he finished with a time of 11:42, last among pro men and 970th overall. Jacobs first responded to his comments via Twitter by calling Messick a "troll." A month later, before the championship, he formally replied to Messick on his website offering an explanation for his performance in Zurich; which he attributed to season-long fatigue. The two later met privately to put their dispute at rest.

Jacobs works with the coaching service BPM-Sport.

Notable results
Some of Jacobs' notable achievements include:

References

External links

ITU Results

1981 births
Living people
Australian male triathletes
Sportsmen from New South Wales
Sportspeople from Sydney
20th-century Australian people
21st-century Australian people